Carthamus leucocaulos, the whitestem distaff thistle or glaucous starthistle, is a species of flowering plant in the family Asteraceae.  It is native to Greece and the Aegean. It is known in California and Western Australia as an introduced species and a noxious weed.

External links
Jepson Manual Treatment
Calphotos Photo gallery, University of California

leucocaulos
Flora of Greece
Plants described in 1813